= No mad Shaun =

South Korean YouTuber (born c. 1990)

- Born: Shin So-un; 1989 or 1990 (age 35–36)

YouTube information
- Channel: YouTube channel
- Genre: Travel
- Subscribers: 657 thousand
- Views: 119 million
- Last updated: February 2025

Shin So-un (Korean: 신소운; born c. 1990) is a South Korean YouTuber and travel vlogger that operates the YouTube channel No mad Shaun (노마드션).

Shin began producing videos in 2021, beginning with videos in the Democratic Republic of the Congo. He has traveled in various African countries, including the Democratic Republic of the Congo, South Africa, and Morocco. He has also traveled in India and Sri Lanka. Shin is fluent in Chinese and has traveled extensively in China. He has appeared in conventional television programs in South Korea, including in the program Earthsweepers.
